

Places

Yeşilova is a town and district of Burdur Province, Turkey.

Yeşilova (literally "green plains" in Turkish) may also refer to:

 Yeşilova, Aksaray, a town in Aksaray Province, Turkey
 Yeşilova, Aziziye
 Yeşilova, Çermik
 Yeşilova, Gölyaka
 Yeşilova, Karayazı
 Yeşilova, Maden
 Yeşilova, Tufanbeyli, a village in Tufanbeyli district of Adana Province, Turkey
 Yeşilova, Adıyaman, a village in the central district of Aksaray Province, Turkey
 Yeşilova, Mersin, a village in Akdeniz district of Mersin Province, Turkey
 Yeşilova Höyük, a höyük (mound) in Bornova, Turkey, and a prehistoric settlement
 Yeşilova, Mecitözü a village in the Mecitözü District of Çorum Province in Turkey
 Yeşilova, Mustafakemalpaşa a village in the Mustafakemalpaşa district of Bursa Province, Turkey
 Yeşilova, Sungurlu a village in the Sungurlu District of Çorum Province in Turkey

People
Yüksel Yesilova

See also

 Yeşilova incident, an armed stand off that took place in April 1991 between British Royal Marines and the Turkish Armed Forces at a Kurdish refugee camp
 Yeşilova S.K. (football club)
 Yeşilovacık, a town in Mersin Province, Turkey